Juciely Cristina da Silva (born 18 December 1980) is a Brazilian volleyball player. She is part of the Brazil women's national volleyball team. With her club Rio de Janeiro Vôlei Clube she competed at the 2013, 2015 and 2016 FIVB Volleyball Women's Club World Championship.

Clubs
  Ipatinga (1999–2000)
  Macaé (2000–2001)
  Minas Tênis Clube (2001–2003)
  Osasco Vôlei (2003–2004)
  Brusque (2004–2007)
  Minas Tênis Clube (2007–2008)
  São Caetano (2009–2010)
  Rio de Janeiro (2010–)

Awards

Individuals
 2012–13 Brazilian Superliga –"Best Blocker"
 2015 FIVB World Grand Prix – "Best Middle Blocker"

Clubs
 2013 FIVB Club World Championship –  Runner-up, with Rexona/Ades
 2017 FIVB Club World Championship –  Runner-up, with Rexona/SESC
 2012–13 Brazilian Superliga –  Champion, with Unilever Vôlei
 2013–14 Brazilian Superliga –  Champion, with Rexona/Ades
 2014–15 Brazilian Superliga –  Champion, with Rexona/Ades
 2015–16 Brazilian Superliga –  Champion, with Rexona/Ades
 2016–17 Brazilian Superliga –  Champion, with Rexona/SESC
 2017–18 Brazilian Superliga –  Runner-up, with SESC Rio
 2013 Club South American Championship –  Champion, with Unilever Vôlei
 2015 Club South American Championship –  Champion, with Rexona/Ades
 2016 Club South American Championship –  Champion, with Rexona/Ades
 2017 Club South American Championship –  Champion, with Rexona/SESC
 2018 Club South American Championship –  Runner-up, with SESC Rio

References

1980 births
Living people
Brazilian women's volleyball players
Place of birth missing (living people)
Volleyball players at the 2011 Pan American Games
Pan American Games gold medalists for Brazil
Pan American Games medalists in volleyball
Volleyball players at the 2016 Summer Olympics
Olympic volleyball players of Brazil
Middle blockers
Medalists at the 2011 Pan American Games